Oxycanus sphragidias is a moth of the family Hepialidae. It is found in Tasmania.

References

Moths described in 1890
Hepialidae
Endemic fauna of Australia